The 1927 Tuskegee Golden Tigers football team was an American football team that represented Tuskegee University as a member of the Southern Intercollegiate Athletic Conference (SIAC) during the 1927 college football season. In their fifth season under head coach Cleveland Abbott, Tuskegee compiled a 10–0–1 record, won the SIAC championship, shut out eight of eleven opponents, and outscored all opponents by a total of 264 to 31. The team was recognized as the black college national champion. The team played its home games at the Alumni Bowl in Tuskegee, Alabama.

Schedule

References

Tuskegee
Tuskegee Golden Tigers football seasons
Black college football national champions
College football undefeated seasons
Tuskegee Golden Tigers football